Repubblica Romana (Italian: Roman Republic) may refer to:

 Roman Republic (18th century)
 Roman Republic (19th century)